Viljoen Kallis Voges syndrome, also known as microcephaly-brachydactyly-kyphoscoliosis syndrome, is a very rare genetic disorder which is characterized by severe intellectual disabilities, microcephaly, low height, brachydactyly type D, flat occiput, down-slanting palpebral fissures, low-set prominent ears, a broad nose, and kyphoscoliosis.

Additional symptoms that appear in at least 80% of affected individuals include decreased muscle mass, dolichocephaly, a high and narrow palate, malar flattening, and a shuffling gait.

This disorder was first discovered in the summer of 1991, by D L Viljoen et al., they described three sisters all over the age of 60 with all of the symptoms described above which were similar to those in Rubenstein-Taybi syndrome. The suspected mode of inheritance is autosomal recessive.

References 

Syndromes with short stature
Rare genetic syndromes
Syndromes with microcephaly
Syndromes with intellectual disability